Greg Carey is an Australian-born voice actor known for his role as "Hun" in Teenage Mutant Ninja Turtles. Carey joined the Charles Sturt University theatrical production, in Bathurst, New South Wales. Carey started acting in 2001 in Are you Game?, a university project. He became a stage manager for One Thumb Out in the same production facility in 2002. He starred in the same year as "Miles Gloriosus" in A Funny Thing Happened on the Way to the Forum, another university project. He's also re-done The United Negro College Fund famous tag "A mind is a terrible thing to waste".

Voice acting
G.I. Joe: Sigma 6 (Additional Voices) 2006
Teenage Mutant Ninja Turtles (Cartoon Show) (Hun / Officer Laird / Triceraton Warrior / Leatherhead (as Gary K. Lewis) / Elfinator) 34 episodes, 2003-2009
Teenage Mutant Ninja Turtles (Video Game) (Hun) 2003
Teenage Mutant Ninja Turtles 2: Battle Nexus (Video Game) (Hun / Traximus / Leatherhead) 2004
Teenage Mutant Ninja Turtles 3: Mutant Nightmare (Video Game) (Hun) 2005
TMNT: Mutant Melee (Video Game) (Hun / Monster) 2005
Turtles Forever (Film) (Hun) 2009

References

Australian male voice actors
Living people
Year of birth missing (living people)
Place of birth missing (living people)
Charles Sturt University alumni